Nuxis is a comune (municipality) in the Province of South Sardinia in the Italian region Sardinia, located about  west of Cagliari and about  east of Carbonia.  

Nuxis borders the following municipalities: Assemini, Narcao, Santadi, Siliqua, Villaperuccio.

History
The village was founded around the year 1000 AD, though there is archaeological evidence of a nuragic settlement, and grew out of a farm settlement. Nuxis' pastoral settlement was aided by the presence of Benedictine monks in nearby Narcao and Flumentepido.

Main sights

References

Cities and towns in Sardinia
1958 establishments in Italy
States and territories established in 1958